The Chinese version of the Volkswagen Jetta is manufactured by the joint venture FAW-Volkswagen since 1991. In 2019, the name was split out from Volkswagen to become its own marque and the model became known as the Jetta VA3.

First generation (Jetta Mk2/A2/King/Pioneer; 1991) 

The Mark 2 Jetta went on to become the first Volkswagen model produced in China by Volkswagen Group China's second joint venture partner FAW-Volkswagen. Production began on 5 December 1991. Initially sold as complete knock down (CKD) kits, local manufacturing has gradually taken over in the form of Semi-Knocked Down kits in 1992, and full local production in 1995.: In 1996 a 5-speed manual gearbox replaced the 4-speed one. The car has had three revisions since its inception in China.

Jetta King

The Volkswagen Jetta King, is a Chinese Volkswagen model produced by FAW-Volkswagen at its plants in Changchun and Chengdu. It was launched in April 1997 and replaced the Volkswagen Jetta. The Jetta King was the result of the technical combination between the Volkswagen Jetta and design scheme from the fourth generation Volkswagen Passat in 1997. Production started in August 1998, and its name was changed to "Jetta King" (or 大众捷达王 in Mandarin). The second facelift was revealed in March 2004 (taking influences from Volkswagen's most expensive model, the Phaeton). On 29 July 2007, it was announced that First Automotive Works expanded its production of the Mark 2 Jetta by building a new assembly plant in Chengdu, Sichuan Province in Southwest China. The expansion was driven by the high demand for the car, a desire to expand in the western part of the country, as well as the long-term goal of FAW to develop new derivatives from the car's platform independently of Volkswagen.
The most striking feature of the Jetta King was the new front end. The interior of the different equipment lines came from the Corrado and Passat B5. The dimensions of the vehicles are different depending on the chosen equipment line. Only the trunk volume of 660 liters is the same for all units.

Initially it was only the 1.6-liter four-cylinder engine with 5 valves per cylinder and a displacement of 1595 cc available. The power of it was 74 kW. It had a manual four-speed gearbox, which later was replaced by a five speed gearbox. From November 1998 onward, there was an option for a 4-speed automatic. A month earlier, the first units were made with ABS (option).

In April 2001, the equipment line Meeresbrise was launched with an EFI engine and a power of 64 kW. A 1.9-liter diesel engine with a displacement of 1896 cc and a power output of 47 kW was added to the lineup in April 2002. The 1.6-liter engine was removed from the engine range. At the same time, the Jetta König was facelifted in 2002 with new front and rear fascias. A 1.6-liter EFI engine producing 70 kW was included in the range. At the same time the prestige model Meeresbrise was replaced by the new Avantgarde. It had dual airbags and can be recognized on the green or black tinted windows. From June 2009 the 1.6-liter RSH engine (type EA111) engine with a power of 70 kW was available.

Following equipment lines of the Jetta King were offered: AT, ATF, Avantgarde, CDX, CiF, CiX, CT, GDF, GiF, GT, GTI, GTX and Meeresbrise.

The Volkswagen Jetta King was also available in the form of a 2-door pickup truck. Few of these were produced.

Jetta Pioneer

The third facelift called the Volkswagen Jetta Pioneer, is a Chinese Volkswagen model produced by FAW-Volkswagen at its plants in Changchun and Chengdu. It was released in March 2010 replacing the Volkswagen Jetta King and taking some inspirations from stylings of Volkswagen models of the newest generation.  A diesel version of the Jetta is also on sale, but a large proportion are in service as taxis in many cities in China, rather than as private cars.

The new exterior brought new production and sales records. It received new front and rear bumpers, along with new grill and lights. Furthermore, there was a new instrument panel with a three-spoke steering wheel to give the impression of a sporty car and driver's airbag as standard. Other standard features were a CD player that could read MP3 CDs, an ISOFIX system for child seats, the seat belt alarm for the driver and an antilock braking system and EBD for better distribution of the braking force. Only the taxi version had electrically adjustable rear view mirrors.

The 1.6-liter RSH with an output of 70 kW (94 HP) served as the standard engine. The consumption is indicated at 7.5 liters per 100 km (31 MPG US). However, the favorable fuel consumption was the optional 1.9L SDI engine with a power of 47 kW (63 HP). The consumption of this engine was indicated at 4.5 liters per 100 km (52 MPG US).

This version of the Jetta was not offered in different trim levels. It was a single model for the Chinese market. It varied in two forms only, one as a family car and the other as a taxi.

This was also the last Jetta in China to use the A2 platform after 20 years of production.

Second generation (New Jetta; 2013) 

The Volkswagen New Jetta 2013 (in Chinese: “大众新捷达2013款”) is a Chinese Volkswagen model produced by FAW-Volkswagen at its plants in Changchun and Chengdu. It was launched in March 2013 and replaced the Volkswagen Jetta Pioneer.

The New Jetta is available with two different engines of the type EA211. These are corresponding by region to the China IV or China V emission standard. It is a four-cylinder in-line engine with 4 valves per cylinder. The fuel injection is controlled electronically, as in all modern engines. The performance is 66 or 81 kW.

Following equipment lines are offered: Avantgarde (时尚), Comfortline (舒适) and Luxury (豪华). There's a 5-speed manual and a 6-speed automatic transmission option.

The New Jetta was given a facelift in 2017 with a new front and rear design and a brand new 1.5 litre engine and 7 speed dual clutch gearbox for the 230TSI model.
To differentiate this version with 2013 type, the selling name was branded as "New Jetta 2017" (in Chinese: “新捷达2017款”).

Jetta VA3A new car marque was launched in China in February 2019 known as Jetta and one of the models, the Jetta VA3 is a facelifted and rebadged Jetta Night. According to pictures found on Chinese car website Autohome, the Jetta VA3 was said to be powered by two engines, a 1.4 litre turbo and the 1.5 litre naturally aspirated EA211 four cylinder engine. The VA3 was officially listed in September 2019 and the 1.5 litre EA211 engine is available paired to a 5 speed manual and 6 speed automatic gearbox.

Gallery

See also
 Volkswagen Jetta
 Volkswagen Santana
 Skoda Rapid (2012)

References

External links

 FAW-VW
 
 
 

Cars introduced in 1979
Cars introduced in 1997
Cars introduced in 2010
Cars introduced in 2013
2000s cars
Cars of China
Jetta King
Jetta Pioneer
Jetta Night
Jetta (China)
Front-wheel-drive vehicles
Compact cars
Subcompact cars
Sedans
Taxis
Police vehicles